Deaconess Gateway Hospital, The Women's Hospital, and The Heart Hospital are all part of the Deaconess Gateway Campus of the Deaconess Health System Located on Gateway Blvd in Newburgh, near Interstate 164, this health care campus offers  acute care, women's health care, heart care, pediatric care, cancer treatment, and radiology and imaging.

References

Hospitals in Indiana
Healthcare in Evansville, Indiana
Healthcare in Southwestern Indiana
Women's hospitals
Buildings and structures in Warrick County, Indiana